Igor Igorevich Bezdenezhnykh (born 8 August 1996) is a Russian professional football player. He plays as a central midfielder.

Club career
He made his professional debut on 17 May 2015 for FC Ufa in a Russian Football Premier League game against FC Zenit Saint Petersburg.

On 2 July 2019, he joined FC Chayka Peschanokopskoye on loan.

On 16 October 2020, he returned to FC Chayka Peschanokopskoye on another loan. On 30 June 2021, his contract with Ufa was terminated by mutual consent.

International
He represented Russia national under-19 football team at the 2015 UEFA European Under-19 Championship, where Russia came in second place.

Career statistics

Club

References

External links
 
 

1996 births
Living people
Footballers from Ufa
Russian footballers
Russia youth international footballers
Russia under-21 international footballers
Association football midfielders
FC Ufa players
FC Nizhny Novgorod (2015) players
FC Chayka Peschanokopskoye players
FC Urozhay Krasnodar players
FC Tekstilshchik Ivanovo players
Russian Premier League players
Russian First League players
Russian Second League players